Rosalia is a genus of longhorn beetles in the family Cerambycidae.

Species
Rosalia contains the following species:
Rosalia alpina (Linnaeus, 1758) – Rosalia longicorn
Rosalia batesi Harold, 1877
Rosalia birmanicus (Itzinger, 1943)
Rosalia borneensis (Rothschild & Jordan, 1893)
Rosalia bouvieri Boppe, 1910
Rosalia breveapicalis (Pic, 1946)
Rosalia coelestis Semenov, 1911
Rosalia decempunctata (Westwood, 1848)
Rosalia dejeani Vuillet, 1911
Rosalia ferriei Vuillet, 1911
Rosalia formosa (Saunders, 1839)
Rosalia funebris Motschulsky, 1845 - Banded Alder Borer
Rosalia gravida Lameere, 1887
Rosalia hariola (Thomson, 1861)
Rosalia houlberti Vuillet, 1911
Rosalia inexpectata Ritsema, 1890
Rosalia kubotai Takakuwa, 1994
Rosalia laeta Lameere, 1906
Rosalia lameerei Brongniart, 1890
Rosalia lateritia (Hope, 1831)
Rosalia lesnei Boppe, 1911
Rosalia novempunctata Westwood, 1848
Rosalia oberthueri Vuillet, 1911
Rosalia ogurai Takakuwa & Karube, 1997
Rosalia pachycornis Takakuwa & Karube, 1997
Rosalia sanguinolenta Takakuwa & Karube, 1997
Rosalia sondaica Kreische, 1920
Rosalia splendens Karube, 1996

References

External links

Compsocerini